is a Japanese manga series written and illustrated by Kashmir. The manga began serialization in the May 2005 issue of ASCII Media Works' monthly shōnen manga magazine Dengeki Daioh. A six-minute OVA adaptation by ufotable was released in December 2010, followed by a thirty-minute OVA released in February 2012.

Plot
A girl named Misuzu rushes home in order to see her elder sister, Naoko. When she arrives there, however, she finds her sister has been replaced by a self-proclaimed yurian named Naoko-san who seeks to conquer the world by 'yurifying' it.

Characters

An alien who comes from the Planet Yuri and takes the place of Misuzu's sister. She appears to have an attraction to young girls. She also loves to read Yuri books and anything that has to do with eroticsm.

A shy human girl whom Naoko-san comes into contact with. She misses her older sister and tends to have flashbacks of her.

Misuzu's androgynous little brother, who is often commanded to do weird things by Naoko-san.

Misuzu's best friend, who wears glasses. She appears to have a deranged crush on Misuzu and is also entranced with anything 'outer-space' related.

Misuzu and Ryota's mother. Like Naoko-san, she also seems to take an interest in erotic books involving young girls.

A robotic version of Naoko-san that lives on the roof of Misuzu and Ryota's home. Her personality resembles Misuzu's older sister.

A pink-haired girl that attends the same school with Ryota and appears to be quite fond of him.

Another female alien who is obsessed with yaoi.

Another female alien with cyan hair who loves manga. She also has a crush on Naoko-san.

Misuzu's older sister who is strangely absent due to ambiguous reasons.

An alien that appears in the first OVA who comes from the Planet Molestrian (according to Naoko-san).

Media

Manga
The original manga by Kashmir began serialisation in ASCII Media Works' Dengeki Daioh magazine from May 2005. The first tankōbon volume of the manga was released on December 9, 2006, and five volumes have been released as of April 26, 2014.

Anime
Two original video animation adaptations of the manga have been produced by Ufotable. The first one was six-minutes in length and was released on December 10, 2010. A second thirty-minute OVA was released on February 15, 2012, as part of an Anime Bunko lineup alongside adaptations of Gyo and Minori Scramble!.

References

External links 
 
Official anime website (in Japanese)

2005 manga
2010 anime OVAs
2012 anime OVAs
ASCII Media Works manga
Dengeki Daioh
LGBT in anime and manga
Shōnen manga
Surreal comedy anime and manga
Ufotable
Yuri (genre) anime and manga